The Atlantic threadfin (Polydactylus octonemus) is a species of ray-finned fish a threadfin from the family Polynemidae which is native to subtropical and temperate waters of the western Atlantic Ocean and the Gulf of Mexico.

Description
It has a pointed snout and an almost straight dorsal profile on its head. There are two separate dorsal fins, the first dorsal fin contains 8 spines in which the bases of each spine is a similar thickness to the others, and the second dorsal fin has a single spine and 11 to 13 soft rays. The anal fin has 3 spines and 12 to 14 soft rays, The base of the anal fin is longer than that of the second dorsal fin. The pectoral fin has 14 to 16 unbranched rays and has a length equivalent to 24%-29% of the standard length and its tip does not reach the tip of pelvic fin. There are 8 pectoral filaments 8, sometimes 9, and the first pectoral filament is the shortest, extending beyond level of front of the pelvic fin while the second to fifth pectoral filaments reach slightly farther while the sixth filament may extend slightly beyond the tip of the pelvic fin. The seventh pectoral filament does not extend as far as the anal-fin origin. The eighth pectoral filament is the longest and it has a length equivalent to 39% to 51% of the standard length. The filaments tend to be longer in adults than they are in young fish. The caudal fin is deeply forked with its upper and lower caudal-fin lobes not bearing filaments. There are 56-64 pored scales in the lateral line which is forked on the caudal fin, with branches reaching onto the rear margin of the lobes of the tail. The upper sides of the head and the flanksare tinged with a slight darkish silver shade, lightening on the lower flanks. It has a semi-translucent snout. The first and second dorsal fins are coloured dusky yellow; the pectoral fin is black while the pectoral filaments are translucent. The dusk yellow anal fin has a white rear margin. The caudal fin is dusky yellowish with a black rear margin.

Distribution
The Atlantic threadfin is found in the western Atlantic where it occurs from New Smyrna Beach in Florida south and west into the Gulf of Mexico coast of the United Statesto the Yucatan Peninsula in Mexico. It is absent from the northern part of the Yucatan Peninsula and from Cuba. Vagrants stray as far north as Long Island.

Habitat and biology
The Atlantic threadfin occurs over sandy or muddy bottoms and on beaches, commonly being observed in the surf zone. Spawning probably occurs in the Gulf of Mexico, off Louisiana and Texas and mainly takes place between mid-December  and mid-March and lasts between 45 and 120 days overall. They typically live no longer then 1 year but may be longer in fish that survive their first pelagic spawning.

Species description
The Atlantic threadfin was originally formally described as Polynemus octonemus in 1858  by Charles Frédéric Girard with the type locality of Brazos Santiago, and Galveston, Texas.

References 

Atlantic threadfin
Taxa named by Charles Frédéric Girard
Fish described in 1858